Nezha Conquers the Dragon King is a 1979 Chinese animated fantasy film produced by Shanghai Animation Film Studio. It was screened out of competition at the 1980 Cannes Film Festival, listed under the English title Prince Nezha's Triumph Against Dragon King, and was released in the United Kingdom as Little Nezha Fights Great Dragon Kings.

Plot 
The film is an adaptation of a story in Chinese mythology (in particular, the epic fantasy novel Investiture of the Gods) about the warrior deity Nezha. After a gestation period of three and a half years, Lady Yin, the wife of General Li Jing, gives birth to a flesh ball, which becomes a lotus flower, from which Nezha is born. Nezha is born able to walk and talk, and is taken on as a student of the immortal Taiyi Zhenren.

The Dragon Kings of the Four Seas, tired of being peaceful, have become cruel and destructive, plaguing China with destructive storms and a drought. The people beg for rain, but the East Sea Dragon King Ao Guang ignores them, telling the yaksha Ye Sha to go and find children for him to eat. Ye Sha captures one of Nezha's friends as he is bathing by the ocean, and Nezha confronts him, injuring him badly. Ao Guang sends his third son, Ao Bing, next. Ao Bing is killed by Nezha, infuriating Ao Guang.

A variety of confrontations ensue between Nezha and Ao Guang. Ao Guang and the other Dragon Kings wreak havoc on the people, causing storms, floods and all manners of natural disasters. Seeing this, Nezha takes his father's sword, tells his parents that he is returning their flesh and bones to them, and calls out for his master before killing himself by slitting his throat.

He is reborn with the help of his master, again from a lotus blossom, and is given new weapons and abilities. After breaking into Ao Guang's underwater palace, he confronts Ao Guang and the other Dragon Kings again, and is finally triumphant.

Release 
In the United Kingdom, the film was broadcast on BBC Two in England in the early evening on 23 December 1984, in an English-language version, directed by Louis Elman and produced for the BBC by Leah International, which retitled the film Little Nezha Fights Great Dragon Kings (rendered in the Radio Times listing as Little Nezha Fights Great Dragon King, in the singular). The voice of Nezha was provided by actress and voice artist Rosemary Miller. As well as replacing the dialogue, it also replaced Jin Fuzai's score performed by the Shanghai Philharmonic Orchestra with one by Ivor Slaney. This version was released on video by BBC Enterprises in 1986 and rebroadcast earlier in the day for a few times during 1988.

The film was released on DVD with the original Chinese audio English subtitles in 2005, with Nezha Conquers the Dragon King as its English title.

The original-language version of the film was premiered in the UK and Ireland in its 2K digital restoration in an online Chinese Cinema Season which ran from 12 February to 12 May 2021.

Awards 
1980 Film Hundred Flowers Awards for Best Art Film

Ministry of Culture1979 Outstanding Fine Arts Film

Special Award,Metro Manila Film Festival, Philippines,1983

Impact 
On May 30, 2014, the first Google Doodle (Google Doodle listing) featuring Nezha was displayed on Google's Hong Kong and Taiwan homepages: the 35th anniversary of the release of "Nezha in the Sea", with the word "Google" wrapped around Nezha's silk and an animated image of Nezha wielding a fire-tipped gun on the sea.

In August 2021, "Animation -Nezha Conquers the Dragon King" special stamps were issued in a set of 6 stamps with a face value of RMB 6.40, and 6.9 million sets are planned to be issued.

Japanese version cast 
 Banjō Ginga as Li Gen 
 Daisuke Gōri as Li Jing – Nezha's father
 Junko Hori as Little boy 1
 Ichirō Nagai as Master Taiyi / Li Jing's chancellor
 Masako Nozawa as Nezha
 Nachi Nozawa as Ao Guang's chancellor
 Mari Okamoto as Little girl
 Chikao Ōtsuka as Dragon King 
 Tomiko Suzuki as Little boy 2 
 Norio Wakamoto as Ao Bing

Other appearances 

On 30 May 2014, Nezha Conquers the Dragon King was featured on Google Search's homepage as an animated doodle.

See also 
 Nezha
 List of animated feature films of 1979

References

External links 

1979 films
1979 animated films
Animated films about dragons
Chinese animated films
Mandarin-language films
Films based on Chinese myths and legends
Works based on Investiture of the Gods